Stockton Rugby Football Club is an English amateur rugby union club, situated in Stockton-on-Tees, County Durham, England. Founded in 1873, it currently competes in the Durham/Northumberland 1 division, the seventh tier of the English rugby union league system, where they have been long-standing members since relegation from North 2 East in 2006. They have played at The Grangefield Ground since 2015, after their move from Norton.

The club were known in their earlier days for having an excellent young team. The introduction of professionalism into the game resulted in the club having a major downfall, though have recently recovered, and are currently respected for their constant pushes for promotion.

Scott Powell serves as director of rugby. Mark Skirving, Robert Green, Geoff Parling and Shaun McLaren are the other members of the coaching staff, their most recent league finish was fifth out of fourteen participating teams in the 2019–20 season; the season was abandoned prior to the season's conclusion due to the COVID-19 outbreak. The club currently runs six senior teams, four academy teams, six junior teams and three women's teams.

History
The club was founded in 1873.

During the late 1980s, Stockton were well known for having a fantastic young team; during this time, they gained three promotions within four seasons to the division now known as the North Premier. Stockton remained in that league for ten years and during the 1990s won the Durham County RFU Senior Cup five times in seven times, which included a run which saw Stockton win this competition for three consecutive seasons. Stockton won the North Division 2, now known as North 1 East, in the 1990–91 season. When that league was named North Division 1, Stockton finished as runners-up in the 1994–95 season, failing to win promotion. Following the introduction of professionalism to rugby union, Stockton suffered hugely: the club maintained amateur status whilst other clubs began to pay their players in bids to rise to the top (Stockton did not pursue this simply because they did not have the money to do so), this in turn led to many key players departing for brighter things.

In 2001, Stockton were relegated to the North 2 East, where they remained for five seasons, before further relegation occurred. Following their devastating relegation, Stockton's youth system went on hiatus as a result of many volunteers concluding their free services. Stockton have since remained as regular members of Durham/Northumberland 1, having failed to gain promotion, though have always been strong contenders for promotion.

The 2010s have been more exciting and promising times for Stockton: their league finishing positions have always been reasonable though it was there major ground move that was most notable. They moved to The Grangefield Ground, in a partnership with nearby Stockton Cricket Club and The Grangefield Academy school: the playing pitches and indoor changing room facility (which includes a state-of-the-art sports hall) are situated behind the school whereas the clubhouse and two junior rugby pitches are situated across the road at the cricket club. In October 2019, the club leased a 5-acre site with existing pitch drainage and changing facilities, providing 6 pitches and a floodlit training pitch. The changing rooms and newly marked pitches were available for usage from 31 October onwards. This new site is located behind the existing pitches.

In April 2020, Stockton appointed Scott Powell, Mark Skirving and Robert Green as the coaching staff ahead of the 2020–21 season. Further appointments followed, as Shaun McLaren – a former first team player of the club and strength and conditioning coach for the Great Britain national rugby league team – joined the team as well as a high-profile Geoff Parling – a notable product of the club's youth system who went on to be capped by England during his professional playing career.

Grounds and locations

Stockton played outside of the traditional Stockton-on-Tees area for 67 years, playing their home games at Norton. In their later years, the club had a partnership with the Norton Sports Charity, where they worked together to improve the facilities and raise more funds for both the club and the charity. For years, the club had opted to make a return to the Stockton area, in a bid to raise the number of people from Stockton to play for the club, and to be a member of rugby clubs that play in their traditional home area where they originated.

In 2015, Stockton departed Norton, relocating to The Grangefield Ground, a newly constructed state-of-the-art sporting complex, located in Grangefield, Stockton-on-Tees. This move allowed Stockton to become more involved within the local community, as they entered into a partnership with Stockton Cricket Club and The Grangefield Academy. Currently, the ground includes six rugby union pitches, a training complex (which includes four changing rooms and a multi-purpose sports hall) and another changing room complex.

Colours and crest
The traditional club colours are red, white and blue: the playing shirt is red and white horizontal stripes, the shorts are navy blue whereas the socks are red and white striped. The club colours have varied numerously: some of the club's teams' kits have varied throughout the years (most youth teams' coaches previously decided on their own kit design until a recent club decision, like other clubs, was to have all teams kits identical though some with different sponsors).

The away kit is either light blue with a red chest or navy and white stripes (very similar to the home kit). Of course, the away kit has always varied throughout the years with different colours and designs.

The club badge contains a castle and anchor, similar to the Stockton Town Football Club badge, which presents the town's shipbuilding history in the seventeenth and eighteenth centuries.

Honours
North East 1 champions (1): 1989–90
North 2 champions: 1990–91

Players

Current squad
First team squad as of 1 December 2019

Team system

Stockton currently runs five senior teams: the first team, which compete in Durham/Northumberland 1; Saracens (second team), which compete in the C.A.N.D.Y. League Division Two; Stocktonians (third team), which compete in the Tees Valley Social League; the Occasionals, who do not compete in a league and take part in friendlies; and Touch Rugby, who also do not compete in any league and take part in friendlies.

The club's youth system is currently considered as one of the best in the North East of England. Stockton currently runs an academy set-up which includes an under-16s, under-15s, under-14s and under-13s. After an academy players concludes his season with the under-16s, he goes on to play for the "Colts" side, the youngest senior team.

Furthermore, the club runs a "midi" section, which includes an under-12s, under-11s, under-10s, under-9s, under-8s and under-7s. The midi players are occasionally mascots and "ball boys" at Newcastle Falcons matches.

A notable player who came through the Stockton youth system is Geoff Parling, a local rugby player who went on to play for Newcastle Falcons, Leicester Tigers and Exeter Chiefs. Parling has been capped for England on 29 occasions, and was selected for the British & Irish Lions' tour to Australia in 2013.

County caps

References

External links
 Official club website

English rugby union teams
Rugby clubs established in 1873
Sport in Stockton-on-Tees
1873 establishments in England
Rugby union in County Durham